Jean Pierre Agustin Barrientos Díaz (born 16 September 1990), commonly known as Jean Barrientos, is a Uruguayan professional footballer who plays as an attacking midfielder for Greek Super League club Volos.

Club career
Barrientos started his career playing with Racing in 2009. He made his debut on 22 August 2009, in a 1-1 away draw against Central Español. On 29 August 2009, playing his second official match, he scored his first goal in the 0-2 away win against Centro Atlético Fénix.

In June 2011, he signed a four-year contract with the Primeira Liga side Vitória de Guimarães.

On 31 July 2020, he joined Volos on a free transfer.

Club statistics

 Last updated on 21 December 2013

Honours
Vitoria
 Taça de Portugal: 2012–13

References

External links
 Profile at BDFA
 Profile at Ceroacero
 Profile at Soccerway

1990 births
Living people
Footballers from Montevideo
Uruguayan footballers
Uruguayan expatriate footballers
Association football midfielders
Uruguayan Primera División players
Primeira Liga players
Ekstraklasa players
Super League Greece players
Racing Club de Montevideo players
Vitória S.C. players
Olimpo footballers
FBC Melgar footballers
Wisła Kraków players
Xanthi F.C. players
Volos N.F.C. players
Uruguayan expatriate sportspeople in Argentina
Expatriate footballers in Argentina
Expatriate footballers in Poland
Uruguayan expatriate sportspeople in Poland
Expatriate footballers in Portugal
Uruguayan expatriate sportspeople in Portugal
Uruguayan expatriate sportspeople in Greece
Expatriate footballers in Greece